Yasin Haji Osman Sharmarke was a Somali political figure and activist.

History

He was the leader and founder of the Somali Youth League (SYL), Somalia's first political party. Having also been instrumental in the organization's creation, Sharmarke and other early SYL nationalists were strongly influenced by the Darawiish of  Diiriye Guure and Sayyid Mohammed Abdullah Hassan (the "Mad Mullah"), emir of Diiriye Guure. Sharmarke was born to the Osman Mahamoud sub-clan of the larger Majeerteen

The SYL was established in 1943. Yasin Haji Osman Sharmarke died in June 1947.

See also
Haji Bashir Ismail Yussuf
Somali Youth League
Mohammed Abdullah Hassan

References

                   

Ethnic Somali people
Somali independence activists
1947 deaths
Year of birth missing
British Somaliland people of World War II